The Cooper T66 is a Formula One racing car from the Cooper Car Company, which was in use from 1963 to 1964.

Development history
The Cooper T66 was the Cooper Car Company's entry for the 1963 Formula One season and was a development of the previous year's T60, with lead driver Bruce McLaren providing significant input to the design. The chassis again consisted of a steel tubular frame but with steel panels welded to the underside to provide additional stiffening, and was clad with aluminium bodywork. Overall the car was slimmer than the T60. The front and rear suspension had double wishbones and coil springs but with revised geometry to correct the T60's tendency to nose-dive under braking. The Climax FWMV V8 engine was mated to Cooper's own 6-speed gearbox.

Racing history
Cooper raced the T66 for the first time at the 1963 Monaco Grand Prix, driven by Bruce McLaren and Tony Maggs. Neither car qualified well, and McLaren finished third with Maggs in fifth place. He followed up with second at a rain-soaked Spa, but the rest of the season was less encouraging, McLaren managing no better than another third place at Monza. Maggs finished second in France but suffered from retirements and at the end of the season McLaren was sixth in the World Championship with only 17 points and Maggs was eighth, with Cooper fifth in the Constructors' Championship. McLaren also had second place finishes in the non-championship races, the Glover Trophy and the BRDC International Trophy.

Cooper introduced the T71 for the 1964 season but the T66 made a couple of appearances with the last works appearance being at the 1964 Austrian Grand Prix in the hands of Phil Hill who had replaced Maggs as McLaren's teammate.

Also for 1963, Rob Walker purchased a T66 for Jo Bonnier to drive but problems delayed its race debut until the British Grand Prix. The car was even less successful than the works cars, with Bonnier's best result being fifth. The Walker car continued into 1964, but mostly as a spare, and its last race was at the German Grand Prix, driven by Edgar Barth.

One of the works cars was used for several years in the Tasman Series while the Walker car was fitted with a 4.7 litre Shelby Cobra Ford V8 and driven in various Formula Libre and Formula 5000 events, scoring several wins in the Libre class.

World Championship results
(key) (results in bold indicate pole position; results in italics indicate fastest lap)

1Two points scored by Cooper T60

Non-Championship Results
(key)

References

Cooper Formula One cars
1960s cars
Cars of England
1963 Formula One season cars
1964 Formula One season cars